AEL may refer to:

 Acute eosinophilic leukemia, a form of leukemia
 Airport Express (MTR), a railway line serving Hong Kong International Airport in Hong Kong
 AEL (motorcycle), an early-20th century motorcycle maker in Coventry, England
 African Explosives, a mining services company headquartered in Johannesburg
 Albert Lea Municipal Airport (IATA: AEL), an airport in Minnesota
 Ambele language
 American Electronics Laboratories; see Mooney International Corporation
 Arab European League, in Belgium and the Netherlands
 Asiatic Exclusion League, in the US and Canada
 Association Electronique Libre
 Athletic Union of Larissa (Athlitiki Enosi Larissa 1964), Greek sports club
 A.E.L. 1964 B.C., AE Larissa GS, Greek professional basketball club
 Athlitiki Enosi Larissa F.C., or Larissa, a Greek football club
 AEL Limassol (Athlitiki Enosi Limassol), a Cypriot sports club, most known for its football section
 AEL Limassol BC, a Cypriot basketball club
 Authorized Equipment List

See also
 Aël, a village in Aymavilles, Italy, notable for the Pont d'Aël Roman Aqueduct